Tamer Ashour (also spelt Tamer Ashour or Tamer Ashur, born 2 January 1984) is an Egyptian singer and composer. From 2004 to 2011 he released more than 17 songs and 4 albums. Some of his better-known songs include  "Zikrayat Kaddaba" ("Lying Memories"), "Ekhtarna Leh" (Why We Chose), "Thania Wahda" ("One second"), and "Enta Ekhtart" ("You Chose").

Career
Ashour released his album "Sa'ab" (Difficult) in 2006, which included material he'd recorded prior to 2006 as well as new music. Different production companies competed to sign him, and in 2008 he joined Rotana. The album Bieyheb followed in late 2008.

At the beginning of 2011, Ashour released Leia nazrah, his second album with Rotana and third of his career. Leia nazrah was a success both in the summit sales cassette market and on the Internet. That same year Ashor began military service. Once he had finished military service he began working on a fourth album, which by the end of 2013 had yet to be released.

Albums
2006: Sa'ab
2008: Bieyheb
2011: Leia nazrah
2014: Esht maak hekayat
2017: Khayaly
2019: Ayam
2022: Tegy Ntrahen

References

External links
 
  Facebook page

1984 births
Living people
Egyptian singer-songwriters
21st-century Egyptian male singers